John Lumsden was an Irish physician.

John Lumsden may also refer to:

John Lumsden (footballer) (1960–2016), Scottish footballer
John McVeagh Lumsden
John Lumsden of the Lumsden Baronets
John Lumsden of Auchinleck Moderator of the General Assembly of the Church of Scotland in 1746